Bi Sheng (972–1051 AD) was a Chinese artisan, engineer, and inventor of the world's first movable type technology, with printing being one of the Four Great Inventions.  Bi Sheng's system was made of Chinese porcelain and was invented between 1039 and 1048 in the Song dynasty.

Movable type printing
Bi Sheng was born in Yingshan County, Hubei a commoner, and his ancestry and details were not recorded.  He was recorded only in the Dream Pool Essays by Chinese scholar-official and polymath Shen Kuo (1031–1095). The book records a detailed description of the technical details of Bi Sheng's invention of movable type printing:

{{Quote|During the reign of Chingli  (Qìnglì), 1041–1048, Bi Sheng, a man of unofficial position, made movable type. His method was as follows: he took sticky clay and cut in its characters as thin as the edge of a coin. Each character formed, as it were, a single type. He baked them in the fire to make them hard. He had previously prepared an iron plate and he had covered his plate with a mixture of pine resin, wax, and paper ashes. When he wished to print, he took an iron frame and set it on the iron plate. In this, he placed the types, set close together. When the frame was full, the whole made one solid block of type. He then placed it near the fire to warm it. When the paste [at the back] was slightly melted, he took a smooth board and pressed it over the surface, so that the block of type became as even as a whetstone.

For each character, there were several types, and for certain common characters, there were twenty or more types each, in order to be prepared for the repetition of characters on the same page. When the characters were not in use he had them arranged with paper labels, one label for each rhyme-group, and kept them in wooden cases.}}

The government official Wang Zhen (fl. 1290–1333) improved Bi Sheng's clay types by innovation through the wood, as his process increased the speed of typesetting as well. Later in China by 1490 bronze movable type was developed by the wealthy printer Hua Sui (1439–1513).

Legacy
Bisheng Subdistrict in Wenquan, Huanggang, Hubei is named for Bi Sheng. The Bi Sheng crater located in the LAC-7 quadrant near the northern pole on the far side of the Moon was named after Bi Sheng by the IAU in August 2010.

See also
History of typography in East Asia
Johannes Gutenberg
Printing press
Woodblock printing

References

Further reading
 Shelton A. Gunaratne (2001). Paper, printing and the printing press: A horizontally integrative macrohistory analysis. International Communication Gazette, 63'' (6) 459-470.

990 births
1051 deaths
Chinese artisans
Chinese inventors
Chinese printers
People from Huanggang
History of printing
11th-century inventors